Guadalupe, also known as Arenilla, is a district of the Cartago canton, in the Cartago province of Costa Rica.

Geography 
Guadalupe has an area of  km2 and an elevation of  metres.

Demographics 

For the 2011 census, Guadalupe had a population of  inhabitants.

Transportation

Road transportation 
The district is covered by the following road routes:
 National Route 2
 National Route 10
 National Route 228
 National Route 236

References 

Districts of Cartago Province
Populated places in Cartago Province